"Move It" is a song written by Ian Samwell and recorded by Cliff Richard and the Drifters (the English band that would later become "The Shadows"). Originally intended as the B-side to "Schoolboy Crush", it was released as Richard's debut single on 29 August 1958 and became his first hit record, reaching number 2 on the UK Singles Chart.  It is credited with being one of the first authentic rock and roll songs produced outside the United States.
"Schoolboy Crush", written by Aaron Schroeder and Sharon Gilbert, had already been recorded in the US by Bobby Helms. Cliff Richard and the Drifters recorded their own version, which was intended to be the A-side of their debut single. However, when producer Jack Good heard "Move It", he insisted that Richard would have to sing that if he was to appear on Good's TV show Oh Boy! On the planned single, "Move It" was flipped to be the A-side and it went to number 2 in the charts, starting Cliff Richard on a career which included British hits through six decades.

Described by AllMusic as "Presley-esque" and by Richard himself as "my one outstanding rock 'n' roll classic", "Move It" was written on the top deck of a Green Line bus by the Drifters' guitarist Ian "Sammy" Samwell while making the trip to Cliff's house for a band rehearsal. The song's lyrics were a riposte to a 1958 article by Steve Race published in Melody Maker which stated: "So rock’n’roll is dead, is it? My funeral oration consists of just two words: good riddance". Samwell did not complete the second verse, so on the record Cliff sang the first verse twice. Samwell finally finished the second verse in 1995 and sent it to Hank Marvin who included "Move It" on his album Hank plays Cliff, with Cliff Richard having recorded a new vocal track which included the new verse. The new version was debuted live at a Royal Variety Performance in front of Queen Elizabeth II that year. Since then, Richard has continued to perform the song with the additional verse.

Influence
The Beatles, in an out-take on The Get Back Journals, were recorded playing "Move It" in medley with "Good Rockin' Tonight". John Lennon was separately quoted as saying, "Before Cliff and The Shadows, there had been nothing worth listening to in British music."

Led Zeppelin included Richard's original version of the song on a 2010 compilation put together by them, titled Led Zeppelin - The Music that Rocked Us.

1958 original recording

Personnel
Cliff Richard and the Drifters:
Cliff Richard – vocals
Ian Samwell – rhythm guitar
Terry Smart – drums

Session musicians:
Ernie Shear – lead guitar
Frank Clarke – upright bass
Mike Sammes Singers – backing vocals on "Schoolboy Crush"

2006 version

In 2006, Richard re-recorded "Move It" with Brian May of Queen on guitar and Brian Bennett of The Shadows on drums. The track was released as the second track on a double A-side CD single alongside "21st Century Christmas". The single peaked on debut at no. 2 on the UK Singles Chart in December. A limited edition 7" vinyl single was also released with "Move It" as the A-side. The track was included on Richard's 2006 duets album Two's Company.

Other re-recordings
Richard has re-recorded the song numerous times, both in the studio and during stage performances. The re-recordings appear on the following albums:

Studio albums
 Don't Stop Me Now! (1967)
 Rock 'n' Roll Silver (25th anniversary album, 1983)
 Hank plays Cliff (Hank Marvin album with Richard as guest vocals, 1995)
 Two's Company (2006)
 Reunited – Cliff Richard and The Shadows (50th anniversary album, 2009)
 Just... Fabulous Rock 'n' Roll (2016)

Live albums
 Cliff (debut album, 1959)
 Thank You Very Much (1979)
 From a Distance: The Event (1990)
 Party at the Palace (various artists album, 2002) Richard performed with S Club 7 and Brian May (on lead guitar) for the Golden Jubilee of Elizabeth II, 2002.
 The World Tour (2004)

Live recordings on singles
 Human Work of Art (1993, CD1) – Acoustic version recorded live at Wembley Arena, 1992
 The Miracle (1999, CD2) – Recorded live at the Royal Albert Hall, 1999

References

External links
 Sound on Sound: Classic Tracks: 'Move It'
 Memories of EMI - Malcolm Addey on "Move It!"

1958 debut singles
Cliff Richard songs
Songs written by Ian Samwell
1958 songs
Columbia Graphophone Company singles
Song recordings produced by Norrie Paramor